King Diamond is a Danish heavy metal band from Copenhagen. Formed in 1985 by eponymous vocalist King Diamond, guitarist Michael Denner and bassist Timi Hansen after the breakup of their former band Mercyful Fate, the first lineup of the group also included guitarist Floyd Konstantin and drummer Mikkey Dee, although Konstantin was replaced by Andy LaRocque soon after the band's inception. Denner left King Diamond after the release of the band's second album Abigail in 1987, with Mike Moon taking his place for a European tour at the end of the year. Hansen also left after the tour, with Hal Patino joining alongside Moon's replacement Pete Blakk. By the end of the year, Dee had also left King Diamond. Dee was briefly replaced by Chris Whitemeier, before he was asked to return as a session drummer for the recording of Conspiracy the following year. Snowy Shaw joined as Dee's replacement prior to the beginning of touring for the album, shortly after his 21st birthday.

Following the release of The Eye in 1990, Blakk and Patino were replaced by Mike Wead and Sharlee D'Angelo, respectively. The band remained inactive for a number of years, however, as Mercyful Fate reformed in 1993. King Diamond returned in 1994, adding guitarist Herb Simonsen, bassist Chris Estes and drummer Darrin Anthony for the album The Spider's Lullabye, released the following year. Due to injuries suffered in a road traffic accident, Anthony was forced to leave the band shortly after the release of the 1996 follow-up The Graveyard, with John Luke Hebert taking his place. Simonsen left after the release of 1998's Voodoo, with Glen Drover taking his place. Paul David Harbour took over from Estes for 2000's House of God, after which Drover, Harbour and Hebert all left the band.

Drover, Harbour and Hebert were replaced by returning members Wead and Patino, and new addition Matt Thompson, respectively. This lineup of the band remained stable for over 13 years and three studio albums, before Patino was fired in July 2014. He was replaced by The Poodles bassist Pontus Egberg.

Members

Current

Former

Timeline

References

King Diamond